7/6 may refer to:
July 6 (month-day date notation)
June 7 (day-month date notation)